Nasr Eldin Omer Ahmed Abdalla El Shighail  is a Sudanese footballer who plays as a midfielder for Al-Naser SC (Omdurman).

Honours

Clubs
Al-Merrikh
Sudan Premier League: 2008, 2011
Sudan Cup: 2007, 2008, 2010, 2012

Al-Hilal Club
Sudan Premier League: 2014, 2016, 2020–21, 2021-22
Sudan Cup: 2016, 2021-22

International
CECAFA Cup: 2007

References 

1985 births
Living people
Sudanese footballers
Sudan international footballers
Association football midfielders
Al-Merrikh SC players
Al-Hilal Club (Omdurman) players
People from Khartoum
Sudan Premier League players
El Hilal SC El Obeid players
Sudan A' international footballers
2018 African Nations Championship players